Housewife (formerly Moscow Apartment) is a Canadian indie rock band with folk roots based in Toronto, Ontario, Canada. Its founding members are Brighid Fry (guitar, vocals; formerly of Kingdom of Birds) and Pascale Padilla (guitar, vocals), with a number of guest players joining them for live shows and recordings.

The band's debut self-titled EP was launched September 30, 2017, following the release of the video for their first single, Annie, the month prior. Better Daughter, their sophomore EP, was released on Hidden Pony Records on July 10, 2020.

The band was formerly known as Moscow Apartment, until announcing a name change on April 26, 2022. As of March 2023, it appears that Housewife is now a solo project of Brighid Fry.

Self-titled EP
Housewife's self-titled debut was produced by Samantha Martin of Delta Sugar, three of the tracks were mixed by Guillermo Subauste, and features Michael Louis Johnson, member of Rambunctious, former lead singer of The New Kings, and brother of Gordie Johnson on trumpet. Blues and Roots Radio noted in a review by Phillip Bridle that "the maturity in the song writing and musical skills of the pair is quite remarkable.... [T]his first EP of five beautifully crafted songs is surely an indicator of special things to come." Shortly thereafter, NOW Magazine included Housewife in its list of Toronto Musicians to Watch in 2018.

Better Daughter

Released  July 10, 2020, the majority of Better Daughter was produced by Fry and Padilla in collaboration with Guillermo Subauste of Pacha Sound, who also worked as the recording engineer, while the song Two Timer was produced by Grammy-winning producer and recording engineer Vance Powell. In writing the EP, Housewife also collaborated with Kevin Drew of Broken Social Scene  and Juno-winner Chin Inejti. The EP was mixed by Scotty Hard.

Exclaim! magazine wrote in its review that the album helps "solidify what's been obvious for years: that everyone ought to know and care about Moscow Apartment,", and CBC named it one of the "22 albums you need to hear" in the summer of 2020.

Awards

 2018, Slaight Music's national It's Your Shot contest.
 2018, Canadian Songwriting Competition - Under 18 category.
 2017, Best Young Songwriters at the Toronto Independent Music Awards. 
 2017, Young Performers of the Year at the Canadian Folk Music Awards.

Members
Current members
Brighid Fry – vocals, guitar, violin
Former members

Pascale Padilla – vocals, guitar, electric bass

Discography

Albums 
Self-titled EP (Independently released; 2017)
Better Daughter (Hidden Pony; 2020)

References

External links 
 Official website

Canadian indie rock groups
Canadian folk rock groups
Musical groups from Toronto
Musical groups established in 2017
2017 establishments in Ontario
Canadian Folk Music Award winners